Gregory G. Nadeau was the administrator of the Federal Highway Administration from 2015 to 2017. He carried out the duties of the Federal Highway Administrator in acting capacity from 2014 to 2015 after his predecessor Victor Mendez began serving as acting Deputy Secretary of Transportation. He was officially sworn in as Federal Highway Administrator on August 11, 2015 and continued in this position until President Donald Trump was inaugurated on January 20, 2017, when he resigned to work in the private sector.

Nadeau also served on the USDOT Freight Policy Council. The Council advises the secretary on the development and implementation of MAP-21 freight policy provisions, including the National Freight Policy, advances the President's National Export Initiative, and at the request of the Chair, makes recommendations to the Secretary regarding freight policy issues.

Prior to joining FHWA, Nadeau served as the Maine Department of Transportation’s (MaineDOT) Deputy Commissioner for Policy, Planning and Communications. In this role, he was responsible for state and federal policy, statewide transportation system planning, communications, freight and business services, and passenger transportation. He also advocated for and lead efforts to approach transportation planning on a systems basis utilizing all modes, and minimizing impact on communities and the environment through integrated regional and community based planning.

Nadeau also served as senior policy advisor to Governor (now Senator) Angus King from 1995 to 2002 and was responsible for a number of policy areas, including transportation, economic development, energy and utilities, environmental protection and labor. From 1979 to 1990, he represented the city of Lewiston in the Maine House of Representatives.

Elections
1978 Primary Election 

 
 
 

1978 General Election 

 
 

1980 Primary Election 

 

1980 General Election 

 
 

1982 Primary Election 

 
 

1982 General Election 

 
 

1984 Primary 

 
 

1984 General Election

References

External links
 
 
 
 

Year of birth missing (living people)
Living people
United States Department of Transportation officials
Obama administration personnel
Members of the Maine House of Representatives
Politicians from Lewiston, Maine
Administrators of the Federal Highway Administration